A Woman Preparing Bread and Butter for a Boy (1660–1663) is an oil-on-canvas painting by the Dutch painter Pieter de Hooch. It is an example of Dutch Golden Age painting and is part of the collection of the Getty Center.

This painting was documented by Hofstede de Groot in 1908, who wrote:10. A WOMAN CUTTING BREAD AND BUTTER FOR A BOY, WHO IS SAYING GRACE. Sm. 54; deG. 48. In a room with a window at the back sits a woman, wearing a dark jacket and a blue skirt. She has a loaf of bread in her left hand, and is taking a piece of butter from a plate on a chair at her left. To her right stands a boy with folded hands, clasping his hat to his breast. The room is in subdued light. The open half-door of a passage with tiled floor beyond looks on the street; the ground before a house opposite is illumined by sunshine. Although the picture has not the brilliant effect so much esteemed, it is a very pleasing and satisfactory example. 
Canvas on panel, 26 inches by 20 1/2 inches. Mentioned by Waagen, Supplement, p. 342. Sales. Amsterdam (Hoet, ii. 288), April 16, 1750 (52 florins). Jan Gildemeester Jansz, Amsterdam, June 11, 1800 (415 florins, Yver). A. Meynts, Amsterdam, July 15, 1823 (1450 florins, Brondgeest). In the collection of the Baron J. G. Verstolk van Soelen, The Hague, sold in 1846 as a whole to Thomas Baring, Humphrey Mildmay, and Lord Overstone. Sale. Humphrey Bingham Mildmay,; London, June 24, 1893, No. 30 (£2625, Colnaghi and Lawrie). Now [in 1908] in the Drummond collection, Montreal.

According to the Getty it then came into the collections of Andrew W. Mellon and Heinrich von Thyssen-Bornemisza's Schloss Rohoncz before being purchased by them in 1984.

References 

A Woman Preparing Bread and Butter for a Boy in the Getty Center

1660s paintings
Paintings by Pieter de Hooch
Paintings in the collection of the J. Paul Getty Museum
Paintings of children
Food and drink paintings